The Azerbaijan, is an Azerbaijani breed or group of breeds of riding horse of Oriental type. In 2007 it was listed by the FAO as endangered; in 2021 it was not among the horse breeds reported to DAD-IS.

Four strains or types of Azerbaijani are recognised as distinct breeds: the Deliboz, the Guba, the Shirvan and the Lesser Caucasus. The Karabakh may also be included in this group.

In 2007 there were just under 70 000 horses in Azerbaijan; 14–16% of those were Deliboz, while the other three strains or breeds constituted 8–10% of the total; 20–22% were of the Karabakh breed.

References 

Horse breeds
Horse breeds originating in Azerbaijan